Dizzy Gillespie and the Mitchell Ruff Duo in Concert is a live album by trumpeter Dizzy Gillespie and the Mitchell-Ruff Duo recorded at Dartmouth College in 1971 and released on the Mainstream label.

Reception
The Allmusic review states "This is one of Gillespie's stronger sets of the '70s".

Track listing
All compositions by Dizzy Gillespie except as indicated
 "Con Alma" - 8:54
 "Dartmouth Duet" (Gillespie, Willie Ruff) - 3:17
 "Woody 'n' You" - 4:53
 "Blues People" (Gillespie, Dwike Mitchell, Ruff) - 11:17
 "Bella Bella" (Ruff) - 7:22

Personnel
Dizzy Gillespie - trumpet
Dwike Mitchell - piano
Willie Ruff - bass, French horn

References 

Mainstream Records live albums
Dizzy Gillespie live albums
1971 live albums